The 1905 Fordham football team was an American football team that represented Fordham University as an independent during the 1905 college football season. Fordham claims a 12–3–1 record, though College Football Data Warehouse (CFDW) lists the team's record as 5–2. 

Eugene McGee, a former Fordham tackle who graduated in 1902, was hired in September 1905 as the team's coach following the resignation of Fred Smith. Quarterback Howard Gargan was the team captain from 1905 to 1907 and took over as head coach in 1908.  The team played its home games at Fordham Field in The Bronx.

Schedule
The following seven games are reported in Fordham's media guide, CFDW, and contemporaneous press coverage.

The following are additional games reported in the Fordham media guide.

References

Fordham
Fordham Rams football seasons
Fordham football